Senator Cortlandt may refer to:

Philip Van Cortlandt (1749–1831), New York State Senate
Pierre Van Cortlandt (1721–1814), New York State Senate